Eulimostraca indomatta is a species of sea snail, a marine gastropod mollusk in the family Eulimidae.

Distribution

This species occurs in the following locations:

 Caribbean Sea
 Colombia
 Gulf of Mexico
 Lesser Antilles

References

External links
 To World Register of Marine Species

Eulimidae
Gastropods described in 2007